Nallavengana Palli  is a village in Vedurukuppam mandal, located in Chittoor district of Andhra Pradesh, India.

References

Villages in Chittoor district